Si Thep Historical Park is an archaeological site in Thailand's Phetchabun province. It covers the ancient city of Si Thep, a site inhabited from around the third to fifth century CE until the thirteenth and spanning cultural periods from late prehistory to Dvaravati and the Angkorian Khmer Empire. Si Thep was one of the largest known city-states that emerged around the plains of central Thailand in the first millennium, but became abandoned around the time the Thai-speaking cities of Sukhothai and later Ayutthaya emerged as new centres of power in the Chao Phraya River basin.

The site gained the attention of modern archaeology in 1904 following surveys by Prince Damrong Rajanubhab, and it was listed as an ancient monument in 1935. The Fine Arts Department has undertaken continued study and excavations of the site, which has also been studied by archaeologists Prince Subhadradis Diskul, H. G. Quaritch Wales and Jean Boisselier, among others. It was listed as a historical park in 1984 and was proposed as a tentative UNESCO World Heritage Site by Thailand in 2019.

Phase I
In the first archaeological phase (c. 4th - 5th century CE), the early settlement of Si Thep occupied the inner town and there was a burial tradition with offerings related to India and communities to the central region and Moon River basin to the northeast.

Phase II
The second phase of occupation (c. 6th - 8th century CE) was characterised with the expansion to the outer city. As the monarchy emerged, Vaishnavism took an important role in Si Thep's society, with relationships to India, Funan, Chenla, and Dvaravati cultures. Si Thep was an urban Dvaravati culture center since the 6th century CE, and one of the earliest communities in Thailand that made contacts with India, attested in stone inscription K 978, written in Sanskrit with Pallava script dated to the 6th century CE. So, Si Thep was developed into an early state along with other early Southeast Asian states like Funan, Chenla, and Sri Ksetra. Charles Higham reports of a 7th-century Dvaravati inscription from Sri Thep that states, "In the year...a king who is nephew of the great King, who is the son of Pruthiveenadravarman, and who is great as Bhavavarman, who has renowned moral principles, who is powerful and the terror of his enemies, erects this inscription on ascending the throne."  A moat enclosed 4.7 square km, while the Khao Klang Nai structure dates from the 6th to 7th century.

Phase III
This phase (c. 8th - 10th century CE) was the most prosperous. An irrigation system was developed, and Mahayana Buddhism influenced in art as relationships with India, Dvaravati and northeastern cities continued. Si Thep, Sema, and Lopburi sites controlled the routes in the region.

Phase IV
During this phase (C. 11th - 13th century CE), Shaivism was a great influence in Si Thep at Angkorian times, and Si Thep had relationships with Phimai in Moon river as Sema ceased to control the routes. Due to Jayavarman VII's policy, Si Thep lost importance and was abandoned around the 14th century. Prang Song Phi Nong and Prang Sri Thep were built in the 11th to 12th centuries.

References

External links
Si Thep Historical Park at the Fine Arts Department's Virtual Historical Park website
The Ancient Town of Si Thep – official Tentative List submission

Historical parks of Thailand
Dvaravati
Angkorian sites in Thailand
Buildings and structures in Phetchabun province
Tourist attractions in Phetchabun province